Jung Yi-seo (born 13 August 1993) is a South Korean actress. She is known for her roles in dramas such as Tale of the Nine Tailed, Mine, Snowdrop, and All of Us Are Dead. She also appeared in movies such as Parasite, Samjin Company English Class, Real, Josée, and Decision to Leave.

Filmography

Film

Television series

Web series

References

External links 

 
 

1993 births
Living people
21st-century South Korean actresses
South Korean television actresses
South Korean film actresses